The 2008 FIBA Europe Under-16 Championship for Women Division C was the fifth edition of the Division C of the FIBA U16 Women's European Championship, the third tier of the European women's under-16 basketball championship. It was played in Monaco from 14 to 19 July 2008. Iceland women's national under-16 basketball team won the tournament.

Participating teams

First round

Group A

Group B

Playoffs

Final standings

References

2008
2008–09 in European women's basketball
FIBA U16
Sports competitions in Monaco
FIBA